A conventional take-off and landing (CTOL), also known as horizontal take-off and landing (HTOL) is the process whereby conventional fixed-wing aircraft (such as passenger aircraft) take off and land, involving the use of runways.

During takeoff, the aircraft will accelerate along the runway, resting on its wheels, until its takeoff speed is reached, at which point the pilot manipulates the flight controls to make the aircraft pivot around the axis of its main landing gear while still on the ground, this increases the lift from the wings and effects takeoff.

During landings, a commercial passenger-carrying aircraft will arrive over the runway while still at flight speed. The landing consists of the final approach phase, the flare, the touchdown, and roll-out phase.

Seaplanes, instead of using runways, use water.

See also
 Takeoff and landing

References

Types of take-off and landing